Coscinida propinqua is a species of comb-footed spider in the family Theridiidae. It is found in Angola.

References

Theridiidae
Spiders described in 1970